Zapruder is a Yiddish language surname derived from the East Slavic "запруда", referring to a weir or a dammed pond. Notable people with the name include:
 Abraham Zapruder (1905–1970), witness to the assassination of John F. Kennedy
 Alexandra Zapruder (born 1969), American author
 Matthew Zapruder (born 1967), American poet, editor, translator, and professor
 Michael Zapruder (born 1969), American musician and songwriter

Other uses
 Zapruder film
 Zapruder's other films, production company of Australian comedian Andrew Denton

Jewish surnames
Yiddish-language surnames